Lyndhurst may refer to:

Places

Australia
 Lyndhurst, Clayfield, a heritage-listed house in Brisbane, Queensland
Lyndhurst, Glebe, a heritage-listed house in Glebe, Sydney, New South Wales
 Lyndhurst, New South Wales
Lyndhurst, Queensland, a locality in the Shire of Einasleigh in North-West Queensland
 Lyndhurst, South Australia
 Lyndhurst, Victoria
 Former electoral district of Lyndhurst, Victoria

Canada
 Lyndhurst, Ontario

Hong Kong
Lyndhurst Terrace

New Zealand
Lyndhurst, New Zealand, locality in the Ashburton District

United Kingdom
 Lyndhurst, Hampshire

United States
 Lyndhurst (mansion), New York
 Lyndhurst, New Jersey
 Lyndhurst, Ohio
 Lyndhurst, Virginia
 Lyndhurst, Wisconsin

People
Archie Lyndhurst, English actor and son of Nicholas Lyndhurst
Francis Lyndhurst, English painter, film director and producer and grandfather of Nicholas Lyndhurst
John Copley, 1st Baron Lyndhurst, British lawyer and politician 
Nicholas Lyndhurst, English actor

See also
Lindenhurst (disambiguation)